Lynch Canyon Open Space Park is a park in Solano County, California. Its trails are part of the Bay Area Ridge Trail.

It is named for the Matthew Lynch family. Lynch Canyon Open Space Park has been operated by the Solano County Parks and Recreation Division and the Solano Land Trust since 2007.

Gallery

References

Parks in Solano County, California